Eric Startin (11 June 1882 – 1955) was a British fencer. He competed in the individual sabre event at the 1920 Summer Olympics.

References

1882 births
1955 deaths
British male fencers
Olympic fencers of Great Britain
Fencers at the 1920 Summer Olympics